Amjad Ali Shah ( 1801 – 13 February 1847) was the fourth King of Oudh from 7 May 1842 to 13 February 1847.

Administration 
His reign began in May 1842. His administration was responsible for a new bridge over the river Gomti and a metalled road from Lucknow to Kanpur. He also built the Hazratganj and Aminabad Bazar, major shopping markets in Lucknow.

Death 
He died of cancer on 13 February 1847 at the age of 47 years. He is buried at Imambara Sibtainabad in the western part of Hazratganj, Lucknow. He was succeeded by his son Wajid Ali Shah.

References

External links
 National Informatics Centre, Lucknow – Rulers of Awadh
 Historic Lucknow By Sidney Hay, Enver Ahmed 

Indian Shia Muslims
Nawabs of Awadh
1847 deaths
1801 births
Indian royalty